Torn Down is a 2018 remix album by British alternative rock band The Cure, and a sequel to the 1990 remix album Mixed Up. It was released on Record Store Day 2018 (21 April, Robert Smith's 59th birthday), as was a remastered version of Mixed Up. A three-disc deluxe edition also includes Mixed Up Extras 2018: Remixes 1982–1990 on disc 2, featuring additional remastered material.

The project was first originally announced in 2009, with Robert Smith saying in 2012 that the double album would consist of "our favourite bands remixing Cure songs", but the final product instead features sixteen new mixes done by Smith himself, selecting one song from each album in chronological order.

On 13 April 2018, the "Time Mix" of Want was debuted on BBC Radio 6. The interview confirms that Torn Down is the last disc in a 3-CD set, with the first being the newly remastered Mixed Up, followed by a "collection of rare 12 inches from '82 til 1990". Robert Smith states that he "just fancied doing some remixes", with the desire to create one from each album and "remix Cure songs that wouldn't normally be chosen for remixing, songs like "The Drowning Man" — the more sort of esoteric Cure songs." The interview also confirms that this release marks the continuation of The Cure's deluxe edition re-release campaign, and that the deluxe edition of Wish has been completed and will presumably follow.

Track listing
All songs remixed by Robert Smith.

Personnel
 Robert Smith – vocals, guitar, six-string bass, keyboards
 Simon Gallup – bass

References

2018 remix albums
The Cure remix albums
Record Store Day releases